Murugesan Dickeshwashankar Thirush Kamini (born 30 July 1990) is an Indian cricketer who has played 39 women's one-day internationals for the Indian women's cricket team.

Cricket career
Thirushkamini started playing at the age of six when her father found her interest in cricket and is being coached by him ever since. She went on to represent Under 16 Tamil Nadu state at the age of 8 and represented Senior state at the age of 10. When she was 15 she represented Under 21 India that toured Pakistan and won Player of the Match. She went on to represent INDIA at the age of 16 and won the Player of the Series in her debut tournament. In 2007, she won the Allan Border Gavaskar scholarship and got the opportunity to train at the Centre of Excellence, Brisbane, Australia.

Thirushkamini is the only woman cricketer to have won BCCI Player Of the Year  on three occasions (2007-2008 Junior Player of the Year, 2009-2010 Senior Player of the Year, 2012-2013 Senior Player of the Year).

She has scored a century against West Indies in Women's World Cup 2013. Thirushkamini overtook Mithali Raj's record for the highest run in a World Cup game by scoring a 100 from 146 balls in the first match of ICC Women's World Cup 2013 and became the first Indian Women to score a Century in World Cup. In 2014, Kamini scored 192 off 430 balls in the test match against South Africa which is the second best score by an Indian women and the highest score by an Indian opener. She recently scored her career best unbeaten 113 off 194 balls against Ireland Women at the ICC Women World Cup Qualifiers 2017 at Colombo, Sri Lanka and became the first Indian woman to score a century in the Qualifiers as well. She is currently a contracted BCCI Grade A player.

She is the only woman cricketer in the history of the game to be declared out for Obstructing the field.

International centuries

Test centuries

One Day International centuries

Personal life 
Growing up, she was coached by Dickshwashankar her father, who was a hockey player for Tamil Nadu. He played alongside Olympian Vasudevan Baskaran.

Thirush Kamini did her schooling in Sacred Heart Church Park School and under-graduation  and her master's degree from M.O.P. Vaishnav College for Women, Chennai. She also completed her MPhil  from Madras University.

She played for Indian Railways while employed by Southern Railway in the personnel branch and. She resigned the job in Southern Railway in July 2021.

Awards

 BCCI Junior Player of the Year 2007-2008
 BCCI Senior Player of the Year 2009-2010
 BCCI Senior Player of the Year 2012-2014

See also 
 List of centuries in women's One Day International cricket
 List of centuries in women's Test cricket

References

External links
 Thirush Kamini at Cricbuzz
 
 Thirush Kamini Stats at ICC Cricket

1990 births
Indian women cricketers
India women Test cricketers
India women One Day International cricketers
India women Twenty20 International cricketers
Living people
Railways women cricketers
Tamil Nadu women cricketers
People from Chennai